Pontoon may refer to:

Buoyant devices
 Float (nautical), an air-filled structure providing buoyancy
 Any of various objects that float on pontoons, including:
 Pontoon (boat), a flat-bottomed boat supported by two or more pontoons
 Floatplane, also known as a pontoon plane
 Floating dock (jetty), a platform supported by pontoons
 Pontoon bridge, a bridge supported by shallow draft open boats or encased floats

Entertainment and media
 Pontoon (card game), the Australian/Malaysian casino game
 "Pontoon" (song), a song by Little Big Town
 Pontoon: A Novel of Lake Wobegon, a 2007 book by Garrison Keillor
 Pontoon, a chiefly British version of the card game blackjack (also known as vingt-et-un or 21)

Other uses
 Ponton (automobile), or Pontoon style, the automobile fender style
 Pontoon, County Mayo, Ireland